The 1966–67 British Ice Hockey season featured a new Scottish League which was later renamed the Northern League for teams from Scotland, Durham and Whitley Bay. Glasgow Dynamos won the Icy Smith Cup.

Scottish League

Regular season

(* Perth and Paisley played all their games for 4 points each.)

Icy Smith Cup Final
Glasgow Dynamos defeated Murrayfield Racers by a score of 12-10 in the Icy Smith Cup Final, which was a tournament that was the forerunner of the British Championship playoffs.

References

British
1966 in English sport
1967 in English sport
1966 in Scottish sport
1967 in Scottish sport